Hapoel (lit. the worker) is an Israeli Jewish sports association established in 1926 by the Histadrut Labor Federation.

History
During the British Mandate of Palestine period Hapoel had a bitter rivalry with Maccabi and organized its own competitions, with the exception of football, the only sport in which all the organizations played each other. At the time, Hapoel took no part in the Eretz Israel Olympic Committee, which was controlled by Maccabi, and instead sought for international ties with similar workers sports organizations of socialist parties. Therefore, Hapoel became a member of SASI in 1927 and later was a member of CSIT.

After the State of Israel was established, the rival sport organizations reached a 1951 agreement that allowed joint sports associations and competitions open for all Israeli residents.

General sports clubs
Hapoel Jerusalem
Hapoel Tel Aviv
Hapoel Holon
Hapoel Haifa
Hapoel Rishon LeZion (handball), Hapoel Rishon LeZion F.C. and others in Rishon LeZion
Hapoel Hampstead

Basketball clubs
 
Hapoel Afula
Hapoel Gilboa Galil
Hapoel Holon
Hapoel Jerusalem
Hapoel Tel Aviv
Hapoel Be'er Sheva

Football clubs
 
Hapoel Acre
Hapoel Afula
Hapoel Ashdod
Hapoel Ashkelon
Hapoel Asi Gilboa
Hapoel Balfouria
Hapoel Be'er Sheva
Hapoel Beit She'an
Hapoel Bnei Ashdod
Hapoel Bnei Jadeidi
Hapoel Bnei Lod
Hapoel Bnei Tamra
Hapoel Haifa
Hapoel Hampstead
Hapoel Herzliya
Hapoel Hod HaSharon
Hapoel Holon
Hapoel Ironi Kiryat Shmona
Hapoel Jerusalem
Hapoel Kfar Saba
Hapoel Kiryat Gat
Hapoel Kiryat Shalom
Hapoel Mahane Yehuda
Hapoel Marmorek
Hapoel Mevaseret Zion-Abu Ghosh
Hapoel Nof HaGalil
Hapoel Petah Tikva
Hapoel Ra'anana
Hapoel Ramat Gan
Hapoel Rishon LeZion
Hapoel Tayibe
Hapoel Tel Aviv
Hapoel Tiberias
Hapoel Tzafririm Holon
Hapoel Umm al-Fahm
Hapoel Yehud

See also
Sports in Israel

References

External links
 

 
Hapoel
Histadrut
Sports organizations established in 1926
1926 establishments in Mandatory Palestine
Jewish sports organizations